Francisco Andrés La Mantia Pipaón is a Venezuelan footballer who plays as a midfielder for Deportivo La Guaira.

External links

References

1996 births
Living people
Venezuelan people of Italian descent
Association football midfielders
Venezuelan footballers
Venezuela international footballers
Venezuelan Primera División players
2021 Copa América players
Estudiantes de Mérida players
Aragua FC players
UD Las Palmas Atlético players
Deportivo Anzoátegui players
Deportivo La Guaira players
People from Mérida, Mérida